Avraham Herzfeld (also Harzfeld) (5 June 1891 – 30 August 1973) was a Zionist activist and Israeli politician.

Biography
Avraham Herzfeld (born Avraham Postrelko) was born in Stavisht, Russian Empire (now Ukraine) in 1891. He attended a yeshiva and was certified as a rabbi. In 1906, he joined the Socialist Zionists. He was arrested in Vilna in 1910 for revolutionary activities, and was exiled to Siberia. In 1914, he immigrated to Ottoman Palestine and worked as an agricultural laborer in Petah Tikva.

Public and political career

During World War I, Herzfeld was active on behalf of Yishuv members arrested by the Ottoman authorities. From 1914 to 1918 he was a member of the Poale Zion party. He was one of the founders of the Ahdut HaAvoda party in 1919 and one of its active members until 1930, when he joined Mapai. In 1920, he was one of the founders of the Histadrut. He was also one of leaders of the Agricultural Association in Palestine.

He headed the settlement department of the Agricultural Association and was involved in the establishment of new settlements for forty years. He was a member of the Jewish National Fund from 1949 to his death. He was known for his habit of bursting into song, sometimes in the middle of his speeches. On the establishment of kibbutz Hatzerim in 1946, he sang a popular song: "This is our fate, / Thus we are commanded, / This is the road, / This our aim, / We have not labored in vain".

In 1949, Herzfeld was elected to the first Knesset for Mapai and remained an MK until 1965. He was a member of the Knesset's Finance Committee, to which he would refer as the "Finance Commission". After his retirement, he worked for the elderly. In 1972, he was awarded the Israel Prize for his special contribution to society and the State.

Legacy
Avraham Herzfeld died in 1973. His house in Holon serves as a museum of the city's history. 

He initiated and raised funds to establish a hospital in Gedera in 1963, part of the Histadrut's Clalit Health Maintenance Organization. The hospital, which bears his name, was repurposed in 1983 as a geriatric rehabilitation health center.

See also
List of Israel Prize recipients

References

Further reading

External links

Herzfeld singing a famous hymn of the Zionist socialist pioneers in Palestine in the 1930, Shuru, Habbitu uRe'u (translated 'Lo and Behold'). *not currently available*

1891 births
1973 deaths
People from Stavyshche
People from Kiev Governorate
Israeli trade unionists
Members of the Assembly of Representatives (Mandatory Palestine)
Israel Prize for special contribution to society and the State recipients
Israeli Ashkenazi Jews
Jews from the Russian Empire
Emigrants from the Russian Empire to the Ottoman Empire
Ukrainian Jews
Israeli people of Ukrainian-Jewish descent
Ahdut HaAvoda politicians
Mapai politicians
Ashkenazi Jews in Ottoman Palestine
Ashkenazi Jews in Mandatory Palestine
Zionist Socialist Workers Party politicians
Members of the 1st Knesset (1949–1951)
Members of the 2nd Knesset (1951–1955)
Members of the 3rd Knesset (1955–1959)
Members of the 4th Knesset (1959–1961)
Members of the 5th Knesset (1961–1965)